Dan Donnelly may refer to:

 Dan Donnelly (boxer) (1788–1820), Irish-born heavyweight champion
 Dan Donnelly (singer) (born 1974), Irish singer-songwriter
 Danny Donnelly (politician), Northern Irish politician